Carl Georg Graff-Wang (18 April 1943 – 18 December 2007) was a Norwegian handball player who competed in the 1972 Summer Olympics.

He was born in Trondheim and represented the club SK Arild. In 1972 he was part of the Norwegian team which finished ninth in the Olympic tournament. He played four matches and scored five goals. He died in December 2007 in Oslo.

References

1943 births
2007 deaths
Norwegian male handball players
Olympic handball players of Norway
Handball players at the 1972 Summer Olympics
Sportspeople from Trondheim